The National History Museum "Gjergj Kastrioti Skënderbeu", also known as the Skanderbeg Museum or the Kruja Museum, is located in Krujë and is one of the most important and visited museums in Albania. The museum was built at the end of the 1970s and was inaugurated on November 1, 1982. Its architecture was designed by architects Pirro Vaso and Pranvera Hoxha (the daughter of Enver Hoxha). Construction works were realized by a local team managed by Robert Kote. The museum has the character of a memorial, architecturally inspired by traditional Albanian stone towers and medieval Romanesque architecture. The name of the museum is in the honor of the Albanian national hero Gjergj Kastrioti Skënderbej.

The Krujë Castle, which houses the museum, is a historic citadel. Ottoman troops attacked it thrice, in 1450, 1466 and 1467, but failed to take control until a fourth siege in 1476. It was this impregnable fortress that helped George Kastrioti Skanderbeg defend Albania from the Ottoman invasion for more than two decades.

Building 
The Skanderbeg Museum project was based on the conceptual platform designed by Aleks Buda in September 1976, which was sent as a design assignment to the Institute of Studies and Projets (ISP) No.1 Tirana, under the direction of architect Pirro Vaso. After reviewing three variants, the ISP decided to continue the work on designing a building based on these variants and decided that the site where the museum would be built was in the interior of the walls of the old Kruja Castle. The design team consisted of Pirro Vaso, Pranvera Hoxha, F.Stermasi, K.Meka, L.Gashi, Gjarçani and R.Agalliu, who designed a building which would be stylistic to the Albanian medieval towers, mainly built in northern Albania. After the museum's draft idea was approved by the Ministry of Education and Culture, the ISP working group started work on the project implementation of this work. The works for the construction of the museum began in September 1978 and they were directed by Robert Kote. In March 1980, the Ministry of Education and Culture set up two working groups for the preparation of the museum content model, pavilions, mural paintings, and so on. The group of historians led by professor Kristo Frasheri and the group of painters led by Bashkim Ahmeti completed this design in the end of 1980.

On 1 November 1982, the museum opened to the public.

Exhibits 
The museum contains objects dating back to Skanderbeg's time. The exhibits have been arranged in a way that chronicles his life and military feats. Paintings, armor, and other artifacts dating back to his time have been exhibited to showcase one of the proudest periods of Albanian history. An interesting display is the replica of the hero's famous goat head-topped helmet, the original of which is on display at the Kunsthistorisches Museum. The memorial building was designed by Pirro Vaso and Pranvera Hoxha.

Gallery

See also 
History of Albania
Tourism in Albania
Architecture of Albania
List of museums in Albania

References

External links 

  Official Website

H
History museums in Albania
Biographical museums in Europe
Museum
Buildings and structures in Krujë
Tourist attractions in Durrës County